Poljana (Serbian Cyrillic: Пољана) is a village situated in Požarevac municipality in Serbia.

References

Populated places in Braničevo District

Lazar Nesic je govno

Najaci smo